Accommodation may refer to:

 A dwelling
 A place for temporary lodging
 The technique of adaptation to local cultures that the Jesuits used in their missions to spread Christianity among non-Christian peoples.
 Reasonable accommodation, a legal doctrine protecting religious minorities or people with disabilities
 Accommodation (religion), a theological principle linked to divine revelation within the Christian church
 Accommodationism, a judicial interpretation with respect to Church and state issues
 Accommodation bridge, a bridge provided to re-connect private land, separated by a new road or railway
 Accommodation (law), a term used in US contract law
 Accommodation (geology), the space available for sedimentation
 Accommodation (eye), the process by which the eye increases optical power to maintain a clear image (focus) on an object as it draws near
 Accommodation in psychology, the process by which existing mental structures and behaviors are modified to adapt to new experiences according to Jean Piaget, in the learning broader theory of Constructivism
 Accommodations, a technique for education-related disabilities in special education services
 Communication accommodation theory, the process by which people change their language behavior to be more or less similar to that of the people with whom they are interacting
 Accommodation, a linguistics term meaning grammatical acceptance of unstated values as in accommodation of presuppositions
 Biblical accommodation, the adaptation of text from the Bible to signify ideas different from those originally expressed
 PS Accommodation, a pioneer Canadian steamboat built by John Molson

See also 
 Accommodationism (disambiguation)